Peter Michael Jacobson  is a retired Judge of the Federal Court of Australia, having served from 17 June 2002 until 24 January 2015. He was in practice as a barrister before his appointment to the bench, practicing extensively in trade practices, commercial law, and equity. In May 1979 he was admitted to the NSW Bar Association.

He attended and was in the athletics team of Sydney Boys High School from 1957–61, he then graduated with a Bachelor of Arts and Bachelor of Laws (Honors) from the University of Sydney. He obtained a Master of Laws from the University of Pennsylvania Law School in Philadelphia and was a member of the Faculty of Law at McGill University in Montreal before returning to Australia in 1976. From 1976 to 1979, he practised as a solicitor.

References 

Australian King's Counsel
Judges of the Federal Court of Australia
Living people
University of Pennsylvania Law School alumni
Academic staff of McGill University
Sydney Law School alumni
People educated at Sydney Boys High School
Judges of the Supreme Court of Norfolk Island
21st-century Australian judges
Year of birth missing (living people)